Ajith Kollam (7 April 1962 – 5 April 2018) was an Indian actor, who predominantly appeared in Malayalam cinema. He had acted in more than 500 films in all South Indian languages. He mainly acted in villain roles. He acted in the Tamil movie Airport (1993).

Background
Ajith Kumar Haridas hailed from Kottayam, Kerala. He was one of six children born to Haridasan and Devakiamma in 1962. His father was a railway officer and mother was a house wife. He completed his primary education at Krist Raj High School, Kollam and Bachelors in Arts Degree from Sree Narayana College, Kollam.

Since his father was a Railway Station Master who was working at Kollam, he was brought up at Kadappakada in Kollam and adopted Kollam as the suffix for his name.

He went to the director Padmarajan to become an assistant director but, seeing his talent, Padmarajan cast him in his movie Parannu Parannu Parannu, and thus made his debut in a Malayalam movie in 1984.  After that, he was a permanent actor in all Padmarajan movies. He turned director and scriptwriter in the Malayalam movie Calling Bell.

Family
He was married to Prameela. The couple has a daughter Gayathri and a son Sreehari. They are residing in Kochi. The Malayalam film director Anil Das is his brother.

Death
He died on 5 April 2018 from a stomach-related illness in Amrita Hospital in Kochi. He was 56 years old at the time of death. His funeral took place at his native place Kollam.

Partial filmography

Hindi

As director

References

External links

 Kollam Ajith at MSI
 Profile, Malayalamcinema.com; accessed 7 April 2018.

1962 births
2018 deaths
Indian male film actors
Male actors from Kottayam
Male actors in Malayalam cinema
20th-century Indian male actors
21st-century Indian male actors
Indian male television actors
Male actors in Hindi television
Male actors in Malayalam television